Ali Al Kandari (born 12 March 1985) is a Kuwaiti footballer. He currently plays for Kuwaiti Premier League side Al Kuwait.

International career

International goals
Scores and results list Kuwait's goal tally first.

References

External links
 Player profileon Goalzz.com
 Player Interview with Al-Anbaa newspaper

1985 births
Living people
Kuwaiti footballers
Association football forwards
Sportspeople from Kuwait City
AFC Cup winning players
Kuwait international footballers
Qadsia SC players
Al Tadhamon SC players
Kuwait Premier League players
Kuwait SC players